

Torneo Apertura ("Opening" Tournament)

Top scorers

Relegation

There is no relegation after the Apertura. For the relegation results of this tournament see below

Torneo Clausura ("Closing" Tournament)

Los Andes had 3 points deducted.

Top scorers

Relegation

"Promoción" Playoff

The teams draw 1-1 therefore Belgrano de Córdoba stay in the Argentine First Division.
Quilmes remains in Argentine Nacional B.

The teams draw 1-1 thereforeArgentinos Juniors stay in Argentine First Division.
Instituto de Córdoba remains in Argentine Nacional B.

Lower leagues

Argentine clubs in international competitions

National team
This section covers the Argentina national team's matches from 1 August 2000 to 31 July 2001.

Friendly matches

2002 World Cup qualifiers

References
Argentina 2000-2001 by Javier Romiser at rsssf.
Topscorers Apertura 2000
Topscorers Clausura 2001 

 
Seasons in Argentine football

es:Torneo Clausura 2001 (Argentina)
it:Campionato di calcio argentino 2000-2001
pl:I liga argentyńska w piłce nożnej (2000/2001)